Thottakkattu Madhavi Amma was one of the founding members of the first (1925) legislative council of the erstwhile state of Kochi (also known as Cochin), in India. She was the daughter of Diwan Peshkar of Cochin and the poet Thottakattu Ikkavamma. Madhavi Amma was the first woman to be an elected member of any legislature in India.

Works 
 Thatvachinda

Notes

People of the Kingdom of Cochin
Year of birth missing
Members of the Kerala Legislative Assembly
Politicians from Kochi
Writers from Kochi
Women writers from Kerala
Malayalam-language writers
20th-century Indian women politicians
20th-century Indian politicians
Women of the Kingdom of Cochin
Women members of the Kerala Legislative Assembly